Marcial Mora Miranda (January 12, 1895 – May 13, 1972) was a Chilean politician, and a minister in the cabinet of Chile in 1930s and 1940s. Mora was the president of Central Bank of Chile from 1939 to 1940.

References

1895 births
1972 deaths
People from Itata Province
Chilean people of Spanish descent
Radical Party of Chile politicians
Chilean Ministers of the Interior
Foreign ministers of Chile
Deputies of the XXXV Legislative Period of the National Congress of Chile
Members of the Senate of Chile
Presidents of the Central Bank of Chile
University of Chile alumni